Henk Hemsing (20 September 1891 – 1 April 1971) was a Dutch diver. He competed in three events at the 1924 Summer Olympics.

References

External links
 

1891 births
1971 deaths
Dutch male divers
Olympic divers of the Netherlands
Divers at the 1924 Summer Olympics
Divers from Amsterdam